A trademark is a word, phrase, symbol, design or combination thereof that uniquely identifies a product or service. It may also refer to:
 Trademark symbol, the typographical ™ symbol which is used to identify a trademark.

Senses of "trademark symbol" 
 Brand, sometimes used interchangeably with "trademark"
 Collective trade mark
 Colour trademark 
 Community Trade Mark
 Genericized trademark 
 Hologram trademark 
 International Trademark Association 
 Logo, sometimes used interchangeably with "trademark"
 Magnificat (trademark) 
 Patent and Trademark Office (disambiguation) 
 Registered trademark symbol
 Trademark attorney 
 Trade-Mark Cases 
 Trademark classification 
 Trademark dilution 
 Trademark distinctiveness 
 Trademark examiner 
 Trademark infringement 
 Trademark of Quality 
 Trademark Official Gazette 
 Trademark Trial and Appeal Board 
 Trademark troll 
 Unregistered trademark

Other senses of "trademark" 
 Trademark look
 Trademark argument 
 Trademark (computer security)
 TradeMark, a skyscraper
 Trademark (band), an electropop band
 Trademark Gamers, game
 Trademark (group), German male vocal trio
 "Trademark", later "My Trade Mark", a song by Cardiacs from Toy World
 "Trademark", a song by Relient K from Two Lefts Don't Make a Right...but Three Do
 "My Trademark", a song by Bug Prentice from Leader of the Starry Skies – A Loyal Companion

See also

 
 
 
 
 Copyright symbol
 Service mark symbol
 Service mark
 Copyright
 Patent